John Hay Whitney (August 17, 1904 – February 8, 1982) was U.S. Ambassador to the United Kingdom, publisher of the New York Herald Tribune, and president of the Museum of Modern Art. He was a member of the Whitney family.

Early life

Whitney was born on August 17, 1904, in Ellsworth, Maine, Whitney was a descendant of John Whitney, a Puritan who settled in Massachusetts in 1635, as well as of William Bradford, who came over on the Mayflower. His father was Payne Whitney, and his grandfathers were William C. Whitney and John Hay, both presidential cabinet members. His mother was Helen Hay Whitney.

The Whitneys' family mansion, Payne Whitney House on New York's Fifth Avenue, was around the corner from James B. Duke House, home of the founder of the American Tobacco Co., father of Doris Duke.  Whitney's uncle, Oliver Hazard Payne, a business partner of John D. Rockefeller, arranged the funding for Duke to buy out his competitors.

Jock Whitney attended Groton School, then Yale College. He joined Delta Kappa Epsilon fraternity (Phi chapter), as his father had. Whitney, his father, grandfather, and great-uncle were oarsmen at Yale, and his father was captain of the crew in 1898. He was a member of Scroll and Key. While at Yale, he inspired the coining of the term "crew cut" for the haircut favored by the rowing crew which still bears the name. After graduating in 1926, Whitney went to Oxford University, but the death of his father on May 25, 1927 necessitated his returning home. He inherited a trust fund of $20 million (approximately $343.9 million in 2023 dollars), and later inherited four times that amount from his mother.

Career

Business career

In 1929, Whitney, despite his vast wealth, was a clerk at the firm of Lee, Higginson & Co where, through his boss, J.T. Claiborne, Jr., he met former Lee, Higginson clerk Langbourne Meade Williams, Jr., who had come to Claiborne for help in his efforts to gain control of Freeport Texas Co. Williams was a scion of a founding investment firm in the sulfur mining company. In 1929, the year after Whitney became one of the wealthiest men in America, through inheritance, Williams enlisted the help of Whitney's boss, who then enlisted Whitney's financial participation, in his efforts to oust founder and Chairman Eric P. Swenson, casting Whitney in the role of corporate raider before the term existed. Whitney was soon Freeport's biggest shareholder, enabling Williams to replace the chairman and his management team. Claiborne was made a vice-president; Williams became Freeport's president in 1933, and Whitney was appointed chairman of the board.

In 1946, Whitney founded J.H. Whitney & Company, the oldest venture capital firm in the U.S., with Benno C. Schmidt, Sr.—who coined the term "venture capital"—with J. T. Claiborne as a partner. Whitney put up $10 million to finance entrepreneurs with business plans who were unwelcome at banks. Companies Whitney invested in included Spencer Chemical and Minute Maid. In 1958, while he was still ambassador to the United Kingdom, his company Whitney Communications Corp. bought the New York Herald Tribune, and was its publisher from 1961 to its closure in 1966. He was chairman of the International Herald Tribune from 1966 until his death. Whitney Communications also owned and operated other newspapers, magazines and broadcasting stations. Whitney's television stations were sold to Dun & Bradstreet in 1969.

Theatre and motion pictures
Whitney invested in several Broadway shows, including Peter Arno's 1931 revue Here Goes the Bride, a failure that cost him $100,000, but was more successful as one of the backers of Life with Father.

An October 1934 Fortune article on the Technicolor Corporation noted Whitney's interest in pictures. He had met Technicolor head Herbert Kalmus at the Saratoga Race Course. In 1932, Technicolor achieved a breakthrough with its three-strip process. Merian C. Cooper of RKO Radio Pictures approached Whitney with the idea of investing in Technicolor. They joined forces and founded Pioneer Pictures in 1933, with a distribution deal with RKO to distribute Pioneer's films. Whitney and his cousin Cornelius Vanderbilt Whitney bought a 15% stake in Technicolor.

Whitney was also the major investor in David O. Selznick's production company Selznick International Pictures, putting up $870,000 and serving as chairman of the board. He put up half the money to option Margaret Mitchell's Gone with the Wind for the Selznick film version, in which he then invested, and later in Rebecca (1940).

Military career
Whitney served in the United States Army Air Forces as an intelligence officer during World War II, assigned to the Office of Strategic Services. He was taken prisoner by the Germans in southern France, but escaped when the train transporting him to a POW camp came under Allied fire.

Thoroughbred horse racing

Whitney inherited his family's love of horses, a predilection he shared with his sister, Joan Whitney Payson. Jock and his sister ran Greentree Stables in the U.S., owned by their mother. In 1928, he became the youngest member ever elected to The Jockey Club.

Whitney and his first wife "Liz" raced horses both in the United States and in Europe. He owned Easter Hero who won the 1929 and 1930 editions of the Cheltenham Gold Cup. In the 1929 Grand National, his horse twisted a plate and was beaten by a nose at the finish. Although Whitney entered the Grand National annually, he never again came close to winning.

The Whitneys entered four horses in the Kentucky Derby in the 1930s, "Stepenfetchit," which finished 3rd in 1932, "Overtime," which finished 5th in 1933, "Singing Wood," which finished 8th in 1934, and "Heather Broom," which finished 3rd in 1939.

Jock Whitney was also an outstanding polo player, with a four-goal handicap, and it was as a sportsman that he made the cover of the March 27, 1933, issue of Time magazine.

In 2015, Whitney was posthumously inducted to the National Museum of Racing's Hall of Fame as Pillar of the Turf.

Political life
Whitney was the major backer of Dwight D. Eisenhower and a member of the New York Young Republican Club.  Eisenhower appointed him United States Ambassador to the United Kingdom, a post held sixty years earlier by Whitney's grandfather John Hay. Whitney played a major role in improving Anglo-American relations, which had been severely strained during the 1956 Suez Crisis, when Eisenhower demanded that the British, French and Israelis terminate their invasion of Egypt.

Personal life
In 1930, Whitney purchased the Llangollen estate as a bridal gift for his fiancée, the Pennsylvania socialite Mary Elizabeth "Liz" Altemus. It was a  historic equestrian farm just outside Middleburg, Virginia. They were married on September 23, 1931. Although married to Altemus, Whitney was romantically linked to Tallulah Bankhead, Joan Bennett, Paulette Goddard and Joan Crawford.  Clark Gable and Carole Lombard met at one of Whitney's parties. In the early 1930s, Jock Whitney began an affair with Nina Gore Vidal; simultaneously, his wife had an affair with Nina Vidal's husband Eugene Vidal. The couple divorced in 1940, but Liz Whitney remained at Llangollen for the rest of her life, becoming an internationally renowned horse breeder and a member of the Virginia Thoroughbred Association Hall of Fame.

On March 1, 1942, he married Betsey Cushing Roosevelt Whitney, ex-wife of James Roosevelt, son of Franklin D. Roosevelt, and adopted her two daughters:
Kate Roosevelt Whitney
Sara Roosevelt Whitney (born March 13, 1932)

Whitney met Fred Astaire in New York City while the former was a student at Yale University and they became lifelong friends, sharing a passion for horse racing. Whitney became a major investor in two of Astaire's Broadway stage vehicles, The Band Wagon (1930) and Gay Divorce (1932), and played a crucial role in securing for Astaire a contract with RKO Pictures in 1933, using his contacts with Merion C. Cooper; both men were board members of Pan American Airways whose planes were prominently featured in Astaire's breakthrough film with Ginger Rogers: Flying Down to Rio (1933).

During the 1970s, Whitney was listed as one of the ten wealthiest men in the world. The residences at his disposal over the years included an estate on Long Island; an Atlantic Beach, NY beach house; Greenwood Plantation in Georgia; a townhouse and an elegant apartment in Manhattan; a large summer house on Fishers Island, near New London, Connecticut; a 12-room house in Saratoga Springs, which the Whitneys used when they attended horse races; a golfing cottage in Augusta, Georgia, where he was a member of the Augusta National Golf Club; and a spacious house Cherry Hill in Virginia Water, Surrey, England, near the Ascot Racecourse. Mr. Whitney also owned an estate in Aiken, South Carolina, which he considered his "retirement" home and where he hoped to spend his final days.

Whitney died on February 8, 1982, at North Shore Hospital, Manhasset, Long Island, after a long illness.

Philanthropy
Payne Whitney made substantial gifts to Yale, to the New York Presbyterian Hospital, and the New York Public Library. After his father's death, the family built the Payne Whitney Gymnasium at Yale in his honor. The family also financed Payne Whitney Psychiatric Clinic at New York Presbyterian Hospital in 1932.

Whitney created the John Hay Whitney Foundation for educational projects in 1946. The foundation provided fellowships to the racially and culturally deprived. He became a major contributor to Yale University, where he served as a Fellow of the corporation.

In 1951, he and his wife Betsey Cushing Whitney donated land from their "Greentree" estate in Manhasset, New York toward the building of North Shore Hospital. Currently called North Shore University Hospital, it is the flagship hospital of the 3rd largest not-for-profit secular healthcare system in the United States, the North Shore-Long Island Jewish Health System.

In 1953, Whitney received The Hundred Year Association of New York's Gold Medal Award "in recognition of outstanding contributions to the City of New York."

In the late 1960s/early 1970's John Hay Whitney donated two small parcels of land in Manhasset to the County of Nassau and to the Manhasset-Lakeville Volunteer Fire Department. The Nassau County parcel was the new home for the 6th Police Precinct of the Nassau County Police, located at the S/E intersection of Community Drive and East Community Drive. Just east of the 6th pct, at 2 E Community Dr., the M-LFD parcel was the new home of Fire Company #2 of the M-LFD, where John Hay Whitney was voted in by the membership of Company number two as an Honorary Member of the company.

Museum of Modern Art
In 1930 Whitney was elected to the board of trustees of the Museum of Modern Art in New York City, and named President of the MoMA Film Library in 1935. In 1941 he succeeded Nelson A. Rockefeller as President of MoMA. In 1946 he succeeded Stephen C. Clark as chairman of the board of trustees

Art collection
When Whitney moved to England as United States ambassador, he took a number of his favourite artworks with him to enjoy during his posting. Before his return to the US, he agreed for the first time to loan part of his collection for the public to see. He provided the Tate Gallery with 56 paintings from the collection in England and specially brought in a further 11 paintings from the US. The exhibition, the John Hay Whitney Collection, ran from 16 December 1960 to 29 January 1961 

In 1983 the National Gallery of Art, Washington held an exhibition of the John Hay Whitney Collection with paintings loaned by Whitney's wife, The Museum of Modern Art and Yale University Art Gallery 

Among the paintings in his collection, Jock Whitney's prized possession was the Bal au moulin de la Galette painted in 1876 by the French artist Pierre-Auguste Renoir. In 1990, his widow put the painting up for auction with Sotheby's, New York and it sold for US$78 million to Japanese businessman, Ryoei Saito.

Whitney's widow donated a number of paintings from his collection to the Greentree Foundation. One of those paintings by Pablo Picasso, Garçon à la pipe was auctioned by Sotheby's in May 2004 for $104 million 

The following works have been publicly exhibited or sold from the former collection of John Hay Whitney.

Albert Marquet, The Beach at Trouville
Alfred de Dreux, Cheval Blanc Effraye Par L'orage
Alfred de Dreux, Moorish Groom
André Derain, Charing Cross Bridge
André Derain, Collioure Landscape
Balthus (Balthasar Klossowski): Le Salon
Bazille, Jean-Frédéric: Pots De Fleurs
Bernard Perlin, Vacant Lots
Berthe Morisot, Hide and Seek (Cache-Cache)
Camille Pissarro, Jeanne with Flowers
Camille Pissarro, Pommes En Fleurs, Temps Gris, Eragny
Claude Monet, Bateaux Sur Le Galet
Claude Monet, Camille on the Beach
Edgar Degas, Avant la Course
Edgar Degas, Cheval de Selle
Edgar Degas, Chevaux de Course
Edgar Degas, La Promenade Des Chevaux
Edgar Degas, Le faux Depart
Edgar Degas, Le faux Depart (drawing)
Edgar Degas, Self Portrait
Édouard Manet, Les Courses au Bois de Bologne
Édouard Manet, Woman in a Decollete Gown
Édouard Vuillard, An Artist
Édouard Vuillard, Demoiselle en Rouge
Édouard Vuillard, Embroiders near a Window (Tapestry)
Édouard Vuillard, La Mère De Vuillard En Profil
Édouard Vuillard, Portrait of the Artist's Mother
Edward Hopper, Cape Cod Evening
Eugène Boudin, Hollyhocks
Eugène Boudin, Roses
George Bellows, Club Night
George Bellows, Crowd at Polo
George Bellows, Introducing John L. Sullivan
Georges Braque, Bouteiile et Verre
Georges Braque, Les Cabines
Georges Braque, The Port of La Ciotat
Georges Seurat, Grandcamp, Evening
Georges Seurat, The Island of La Grande Jatte
Gustave Courbet, The Hound
Henri de Toulouse-Lautrec, Marcelle Lender Dancing the Bolero in "Chilperic"
Henri Fantin-Latour,  Roses
Henri Fantin-Latour, Vase of Flowers
Henri Matisse, Luxe, Calme et Volupte
Henri Matisse, Nature Morte au Purro II
Henri Matisse, Open Window, Collioure
Henri Rousseau, L'Heureux Quatuor (the Happy Quartet)
Henri Rousseau, Tropical Forest with Monkeys
Henri-Edmond Cross, Coast near Antibes
Henri-Edmond Cross, The Grape Harvest
Honoré Daumier, Joueurs Des Cartes
James McNeill Whistler, Wapping on Thames
Jean-Baptiste-Camille Corot, Chaumieres Et Moulins Au Bord D'un Torrent (Morvan Ou Auvergne)
Jean-Baptiste-Siméon Chardin, Still Life
John Constable, View of the back of a terrace of houses at Hampstead, with an elder tree 
John Singer Sargent, Robert Louis Stevenson
John Singer Sargent, Venetian Courtyard
Kees van Dongen, Saida
Maurice de Vlaminck, Tugboat on the Seine, Chatou
Maurice Utrillo, The Rue des Abbesses, Montmartre
Odilon Redon, Fleurs Dans Un Vase Vert
Pablo Picasso, Ace of Clubs
Pablo Picasso, Garçon à la pipe Le jeune Apprenti
Pablo Picasso, Head of a Sleeping Woman
Pablo Picasso, Homme assis (seated man)
Pablo Picasso, Plant de Tomate 
Pablo Picasso, Self Portrait 
Pablo Picasso, Still Life (Le Journal)
Pablo Picasso, Still Life with a Bottle of Maraschino
Pablo Picasso, Still Life with Fruit and Glass
Pablo Picasso, Still Life with vase, Gourd and Fruit
Paul Cézanne, Route Tournante a Montgeroult
Paul Cézanne, Still Life With Curtain, Pitcher and Bowl of Fruit
Paul Gauguin, Parau-Parau
Paul Signac, Collioure  Le Mohamed-El-Sadok
Paul Signac, Fishing Boats in the Sunset
Paul Signac, The Yawl
Pierre-Auguste Renoir, La Foret de Marly
Pierre-Auguste Renoir, La Yole
Pierre-Auguste Renoir, Liseuse
Pierre-Auguste Renoir, Bal du moulin de la Galette
Raoul Dufy, Beach at Saint-Adresse
Raoul Dufy, Fete a Sainte-Adresse
Raoul Dufy, Jockeys et Turfistes À Epsom
Raoul Dufy, Sailboats at Le Havre
Roger de La Fresnaye, Still Life, Coffee, Pot and Melon
Rufino Tamayo, Women
Sir Alfred Munnings, Before the Start
Sir Alfred Munnings, Leaving The Paddock At Epsom Downs
Sir Alfred Munnings, The Red Prince Mare
Sir Alfred Munnings, The Winner
Sir John Lavery, Weighing in at Sandown Park
Théo van Rysselberghe, Port Cette
Théodore Géricault, Cheval de Napoleon
Théodore Géricault, Officier de Cavalerie à Cheval
Théodore Rousseau, The Isle of Capri
Thomas Eakins, Baby at Play
Thomas Eakins, The Oarsmen
Vincent van Gogh, Les Oliviers, St Remy
Vincent van Gogh, Self Portrait
William Blake, The Good and Evil Angels Struggling For Possession of a Child
Winslow Homer, Woodshopper in the Adirondacks	
Fosburgh, Daisies

Sources: 
John Hay Whitney Collection (Catalogue), Tate Gallery, 1960, John Hay Whitney Collection (Catalogue), National Gallery of Art, 1983, Sotheby's Catalogue, auction 10 May 1999, Sotheby's Catalogue, auction 5 May 2004

Anecdotes
Whitney gave Fred Astaire a pair of big-wheel roller skates as a present. A few years later roller skating was one of his most important dance numbers on film.

Whitney and Jimmy Altemus provided the lyrics for a sing composed by Fred Astaire, "Tappin' the Time."

President Dwight D. Eisenhower took pains to transmit to Ambassador Whitney in London, by telegram, the first round golf scores of the Masters Tournament at the Augusta National Golf Club on 5 April 1957.

Ambassador Whitney had a very demanding and exhausting scheduled but was not fazed by it. After having been to three or four receptions one day, his wife was not surprised to find their chauffeur, groggy from his rounds, dozing on the back seat of their limousine and the Ambassador driving the car.

Whitney: "I have just had a heart attack and am on a very strict diet. However if you will twist my arm a little, I will probably give in and we will consume a number of very large dry martinis" 

William S. Paley (the legendary founder of CBS), who was Whitney's brother in law, had a gentle rivalry with Whitney. Once while watching television with Whitney at Greentree, Paley wanted to change the channel. 'Where's your clicker?' Paley asked, figuring Jock would have a remote-control switch at his fingertips. Jock calmly pressed a buzzer, and his butler walked up to the TV set to make the switch.

The White House Is Nice, But It's No Greentree! E. J. Kahn, Mr. Whitney's biographer, reported that one of his daughters, Kate, once took her own children on a tour of the White House. Mr. Kahn wrote, After inspecting it, they pronounced it nice enough but hardly on a par with Greentree. [Greentree was the more prestigious of his Long Island residences']

References

Sources

External links
 
 Philadelphia Inquirer Obituary 9 Feb 1982
 
 Manhasset-Lakeville Fire Department

1904 births
1982 deaths
20th-century American newspaper publishers (people)
Ambassadors of the United States to the United Kingdom
American art collectors
American escapees
American prisoners of war in World War II
Philanthropists from New York (state)
American socialites
United States Army Air Forces personnel of World War II
Elijah Parish Lovejoy Award recipients
New York Herald Tribune people
People from Ellsworth, Maine
Whitney family
World War II prisoners of war held by Germany
Yale College alumni
Groton School alumni
Private equity and venture capital investors
United States Army Air Forces officers
Virginia Republicans
New York (state) Republicans
People from Manhasset, New York
People from Middleburg, Virginia
Escapees from German detention
People of the Office of Strategic Services
20th-century American diplomats